The 1981 Wimbledon Championships was a tennis tournament that took place on the outdoor grass courts at the All England Lawn Tennis and Croquet Club in Wimbledon, London, United Kingdom. The tournament ran from 22 June until 4 July. It was the 95th staging of the Wimbledon Championships, and the second Grand Slam tennis event of 1981.

For the first time in the tournament's history there were no seeded British players in the singles draws.

Prize money
The total prize money for 1981 championships was £322,136. The winner of the men's title earned £21,600 while the women's singles champion earned £19,440. However, the ladies champion was additionally presented with a diamond necklace, donated to the club, valued at £3,000.00, which technically made the ladies prize higher than the gentleman's for the only time in the championships history.

* per team

Champions

Seniors

Men's singles

 John McEnroe  defeated  Björn Borg, 4–6, 7–6(7–1), 7–6(7–4), 6–4
 It was McEnroe's 3rd career Grand Slam title and his 1st Wimbledon title.

Women's singles

 Chris Evert Lloyd defeated  Hana Mandlíková, 6–2, 6–2
 It was Evert-Lloyd's 12th career Grand Slam title and her third and last Wimbledon title.

Men's doubles

 Peter Fleming /  John McEnroe defeated  Bob Lutz /  Stan Smith, 6–4, 6–4, 6–4
 It was Fleming's 3rd career Grand Slam title and his 2nd Wimbledon title. It was McEnroe's 7th career Grand Slam title and his 3rd Wimbledon title.

Women's doubles

 Martina Navratilova /  Pam Shriver defeated  Kathy Jordan /  Anne Smith, 6–3, 7–6(8–6)
 It was Navratilova's 11th career Grand Slam title and her 5th Wimbledon title. It was Shriver's 1st career Grand Slam title and her 1st Wimbledon title.

Mixed doubles

 Frew McMillan /  Betty Stöve defeated  John Austin /  Tracy Austin, 4–6, 7–6(7–2), 6–3
 It was McMillan's 10th and last career Grand Slam title and his 5th Wimbledon title. It was Stöve's 10th and last career Grand Slam title and her 3rd Wimbledon title.

Juniors

Boys' singles

 Matt Anger defeated  Pat Cash, 7–6(7–3), 7–5

Girls' singles

 Zina Garrison defeated  Rene Uys, 6–4, 3–6, 6–0

Singles seeds

Men's singles
  Björn Borg (final, lost to John McEnroe)
  John McEnroe (champion)
  Jimmy Connors (semifinals, lost to Björn Borg)
  Ivan Lendl (first round, lost to Charlie Fancutt)
  Gene Mayer (withdrew before the tournament began)
  Brian Teacher (second round, lost to Vijay Amritraj)
  Brian Gottfried (second round, lost to Jeff Borowiak)
  Roscoe Tanner (second round, lost to Carlos Kirmayr)
  José Luis Clerc (third round, lost to Paul Kronk)
  Guillermo Vilas (first round, lost to Mark Edmondson)
  Víctor Pecci (first round, lost to Bill Scanlon)
  Peter McNamara (quarterfinals, lost to Björn Borg)
  Yannick Noah (first round, lost to Eric Fromm)
  Wojciech Fibak (fourth round, lost to Jimmy Connors)
  Balázs Taróczy (third round, lost to Stan Smith)
  Vitas Gerulaitis (fourth round, lost to Björn Borg)

Women's singles
  Chris Evert Lloyd (champion)
  Hana Mandlíková (final, lost to Chris Evert Lloyd)
  Tracy Austin (quarterfinals, lost to Pam Shriver)
  Martina Navratilova (semifinals, lost to Hana Mandlíková)
  Andrea Jaeger (fourth round, lost to Mima Jaušovec)
  Wendy Turnbull (quarterfinals, lost to Hana Mandlíková)
  Pam Shriver (semifinals, lost to Chris Evert Lloyd)
  Virginia Ruzici (quarterfinals, lost to Martina Navratilova)
  Sylvia Hanika (first round, lost to Mary-Lou Piatek)
  Mima Jaušovec (quarterfinals, lost to Chris Evert Lloyd)
  Dianne Fromholtz (third round, lost to Claudia Pasquale)
  Kathy Jordan (fourth round, lost to Virginia Ruzici)
  Bettina Bunge (second round, lost to Sue Barker)
  Barbara Potter (fourth round, lost to Tracy Austin)
  Regina Maršíková (first round, lost to Lucia Romanov)
  JoAnne Russell (first round, lost to Pam Teeguarden)

References

External links
 Official Wimbledon Championships website

 
Wimbledon Championships
Wimbledon Championships
Wimbledon
Wimbledon